Chris Wetherell is a software developer and musician from the US best known as the founder of Google Reader and as an influential "ex-Googler" since his departure from the company.

Software engineer
While working at Google in 2005 as a Senior Software Engineer, Wetherell was involved in developing the feed aggregator Google Reader.

After leaving Google, Wetherell worked at Twitter as Consulting Project Lead on a new "Retweet" feature, co-founded Thing Labs and worked on Brizzly, before co-founding Avocado to produce an intimacy application of the same name and a social spin-off called Pears (Avocado closed in February 2017). Avocado was invested in by General Catalyst and Lightspeed Venture Partners among others.

Musician
Wetherell is also a musician, performing drums and vocals for American rock bands Dealership and Citizens Here and Abroad.

Personal life 
Wetherell is a native of Beaverton, Oregon.

References

External links
 Wetherell's personal site Massless

American computer specialists
Year of birth missing (living people)
Living people
Google employees